Helaletes is an extinct perissodactyl closely related to tapirs. Fossils have been found in North America.

Taxonomy
The type species of Helaletes, H. nanus, is known from Bridgerian-age fossils in the western US. Desmatotherium mongoliensis was previously referred to Helaletes, but Bai et al. (2017) found it distantly related to the H. nanus type species, while excluding the nominal species H. medius Qiu, 1987 from Helaletidae.

References

Prehistoric tapirs
Eocene odd-toed ungulates
Eocene mammals of North America
Taxa named by Othniel Charles Marsh
Fossil taxa described in 1872